In mathematics, dynamic equation can refer to:

difference equation in discrete time
differential equation in continuous time
time scale calculus in combined discrete and continuous time

Dynamical systems